Arizona's 18th Legislative District is one of 30 in the state, situated in Maricopa County. As of 2021, there are 41 precincts in the district, with a total registered voter population of 161,729. The district has an overall population of 235,086.

Political representation
The district is represented for the 2021–2022 Legislative Session in the Arizona State Senate by Sean Bowie (D) and in the Arizona House of Representatives by Mitzi Epstein (D) and Jennifer Jermaine (D).

References

Maricopa County, Arizona
Arizona legislative districts